Dante Varona (born 1953) is a former Filipino actor and film director. He was considered one of the more famous action stars from the 1970s up to the 1980s along with Fernando Poe, Jr., Joseph Estrada, Jun Aristorenas, Ramon Revilla, Bernard Bonnin, Jess Lapid, Jr., Rhene Imperial, Tony Ferrer, Ramon Zamora, Rey Malonzo, Baldo Marro, Anthony Alonzo, Lito Lapid, Rudy Fernandez, Bembol Roco, Efren Reyes, Jr. and Ace Vergel, among others. One of his famous stunts involved jumping from the San Juanico Bridge in Hari ng Stunt (King of Stunts).

Career
Varona began his movie career in 1968 in Mangificent Siete Bandidas. Leading roles in his early career included Master Stuntman (1970) and Leon Dimasupil (1973). He did also a movie Gulapa (1977) with Ramon Revilla in a true-to-life-story of former Mayor Patrocinio Z. Gulapa of Maragondon, Cavite and the movie Carding Estrabel: Tirador Ng Malabon (1980), based on the life story of Ricardo Luciano. In 1981, action star Dante Varona made a daring and spectacular stunt act when he jumped at the San Juanico Bridge for a scene in “Hari ng Stunt.” It’s a make-or-break for this struggling actor whose movie career was in limbo for quite sometime and can’t seem to have a headstart. That breathtaking leap changed his fortune overnight. The movie was dubbed as “The most death defying action thriller of the year!” He became an instant sensation and propelled him to superstardom. He directed some of his films' Raging Anger (1984), Bangkay Mo Akong Hahakbangin (1986) and Ratratan (1999). He was included in a Hollywood movie Dune Warriors, starring David Carradine, Rick Hill, Blake Boyd and Maria Isabel Lopez.

He is the father of Metropop Songfest finalist and singer Tanya Varona.

Filmography

References

External links

1953 births
Living people
Filipino male film actors
Filipino male child actors
Filipino film directors
Stunt performers